Voskresenskoye is a rural locality (a village) and the administrative centre of Zarechensky Selsoviet, Kugarchinsky District, Bashkortostan, Russia. The population was 629 as of 2010. There are 11 streets.

Geography 
Voskresenskoye is located 22 km northwest of Mrakovo (the district's administrative centre) by road. Kaldarovo is the nearest rural locality.

References 

Rural localities in Kugarchinsky District